Riverview is an unincorporated historic community in Umatilla County, Oregon, United States. Riverview was a station of the Union Pacific Railroad, near the Columbia River and north of U.S. Route 730.

References

Former populated places in Umatilla County, Oregon
Union Pacific Railroad stations in Oregon
Former populated places in Oregon